Euphorbia quartziticola is a species of plant in the family Euphorbiaceae. It is endemic to Madagascar.  Its natural habitat is subtropical or tropical high-altitude grassland.

References

Endemic flora of Madagascar
quartziticola
Endangered plants
Taxonomy articles created by Polbot